Parnas Tower (Korean: 파르나스 타워) is a 38-floor,  skyscraper in Gangnam-gu, Seoul. It was developed by GS Engineering & Construction in 2016 and was sold to an affiliate, GS Retail.

See also
List of tallest buildings in Seoul

References

External links
 

Office buildings completed in 2016
Skyscraper office buildings in Seoul
Skyscraper hotels in South Korea
2016 establishments in South Korea